The 2014–15 Ukrainian First League was the 24th since its establishment. The competition commenced on 26 July 2014 with seven matches. Due to sponsorship reasons the league is called Favbet League 1.  The competition was on winter recess from 17 November until 20 March when the competition resumed with the Round 18 match between FC Ternopil and MFC Mykolaiv.

Teams
The number of teams for the competition was confirmed on 7 July 2014.

Promoted teams
Four teams were promoted from the 2013–14 Ukrainian Second League.

 Hirnyk-Sport Komsomolsk – champion (debut)
 Stal Dniprodzerzhynsk – 2nd placed runner-up (returning after an absence of 6 seasons)
 FC Ternopil – 3rd placed runner-up (debut)
 Hirnyk Kryvyi Rih – 4th placed runner-up (debut)

Relegated teams 
No teams were relegated from the 2013–14 Ukrainian Premier League. Tavriya Simferopol was to be relegated from the Ukrainian Premier League but the team terminated its existence after the annexation of Crimea by Russia.

Withdrawn teams 
 Tytan Armyansk withdrew from the PFL and later terminated their existence due to the annexation of Crimea.

Suspended teams 
 FC Avanhard Kramatorsk were suspended from the PFL due to the war in Donbass.

Merged teams 

PFC Oleksandriya refused promotion to the Premier League. Prior to the season PFC Oleksandriya and UkrAhroKom Holovkivka merged into one club renaming themselves to FC Oleksandriya.

Location map 
The following displays the location of teams.

Stadiums 

The following stadiums are considered home grounds for the teams in the competition.

Managers

Managerial changes

League table

Results

Position by round

Promotion/relegation play-off
A promotion/relegation home and away play-off is to be played by the 3rd place team of 2014–15 Ukrainian Second League against the 14th placed team of the 2014–15 Ukrainian First League competition. Seedings for the playoff were announced in Ukrainian House of Football on May 29.

First leg

Second leg

MFC Mykolaiv wins 1–0 on aggregate and remains in First League

Top goalscorers

See also
 2014–15 Ukrainian Premier League
 2014–15 Ukrainian Premier League Reserves and Under 19
 2014–15 Ukrainian Second League
 2014–15 Ukrainian Cup

References

Ukrainian First League seasons
2014–15 in Ukrainian association football leagues
UK